Diaethria eluina, the eluina eighty-eight, is a species of butterfly of the family Nymphalidae. It is found from Peru to Bolivia and Brazil.

The wingspan is about 30–40 mm. Adults are black with a blue band on each wing. The underside is red and white with black stripes.

Subspecies
Diaethria eluina eluina (Brazil (Minas Gerais), Paraguay)
Diaethria eluina lidwina  (C. & R. Felder, 1862)  (Peru)
Diaethria eluina splendidus  (Oberthür, 1916)  (Brazil (Goiás))

External links
 Butterfly Corner 

Biblidinae
Butterflies described in 1855
Fauna of Brazil
Nymphalidae of South America